Ashley Audrain (born 1982) is a Canadian writer.  During a July 2019 interview with the Toronto Star Audrain described her debut novel, The Push, as a "psychological drama told through the lens of motherhood." The story is about a woman who is unsure whether or not there is something wrong with her daughter, Violet. This causes strain in her marriage to a man named Fox Connor. 

Prior to turning her hand to writing, Audrain was publicity director for Penguin Canada, which is now an imprint of the Canadian division of Penguin Random House.  In 2015 a health crisis with her youngest child caused her to retire.   She found writing was an occupation she could undertake at home. 

The Bookseller reports that her UK book deal, with Michael Joseph Limited, an imprint of the UK division of Penguin Random House, was worth approximately one million British pounds, while her US book deal was in "the high seven figures".
The first book of the two book deal was released for sale in US and Canada on January 5, 2021.

References

21st-century Canadian novelists
21st-century Canadian women writers
Canadian women novelists
Living people
1982 births
People from Newmarket, Ontario